Parashurama, also referred to as Rama Jamadagnya, Rama Bhargava and Veerarama, is the sixth avatar among the Dashavatara of the preserver god Vishnu in Hinduism. He is believed to be one of the Chiranjeevis (Immortals), who will appear at the end of the Kali Yuga to be the guru of Vishnu's tenth and last incarnation, Kalki. 

Born to Jamadagni and Renuka, the Brahmin Parashurama was foretold to appear at a time when overwhelming evil prevailed on the earth. The Kshatriya class, with weapons and power, had begun to abuse their power, take what belonged to others by force and tyrannise people. He corrected the cosmic equilibrium by destroying the Kshatriya warriors twenty-one times. He is married to Dharani, an incarnation of Lakshmi, the wife of Vishnu. He is present in the Ramayana due to the conflict with Rama (the protagonist of the Ramayana) over Shiva's broken bow. He is mentioned in the Mahabharata as the guru of Bhisma, Drona, Rukmi, and Karna.

Legend 

According to Hindu mythology, Parashurama was born to the sage Jamadagni and his Kshatriya wife, Renuka, living in a hut (believed in local tradition to be located at Janapav). They had a celestial cow called Surabhi, which gives them all that they desire (Surabhi is the daughter of cow Kamadhenu). A king named Kartavirya Arjuna (not to be confused with Arjuna, the Pandava) – learns about this cow of plenty and wants it. He asks Jamadagni to give it to him, but the sage refuses. While Parashurama is away from the hut, the king takes it by force. When Jamadagni pleads his case and seeks for the return of the cow, the king strikes him with his fist, killing him. Parashurama learns about this crime, and is upset. With his axe in his hand, he challenges the king to battle. They fight, and Parashurama defeats and kills the king, according to the Padma Purana.

The warrior class challenges him, and he slays every single member of the class, save for those belonging to the lineages of Manu and Ikshvaku. The mighty son of Jamadagni, having rid the world of the Kshatriyas, then performs the Ashvamedha sacrifice. He grants the earth with the seven islands to principal rishis belonging to the Brahmin class. Having renounced the earth and his violent deeds, he retires to the hermitage of Nara-Narayana to engage in penance. The legend likely has roots in the ancient conflict between the Brahmin varna, with knowledge duties, and the Kshatriya varna, with warrior and enforcement roles.

Parashurama in geographical myths 

There are legends dealing with the origins of the western coast geographically and culturally. One such legend is the retrieval of the West Coast from the sea, by Parashurama, a warrior sage. It proclaims that Parashurama, an Incarnation of Mahavishnu, threw His battle axe into the sea. As a result, the land of the Western coast arose, and thus was reclaimed from the waters. The place from which he threw his axe (or shot an arrow) is on Salher fort (the second highest peak and the highest fort in Maharashtra) in the Baglan taluka of Nashik district of Maharashtra. There is a temple on the summit of this fort dedicated to Parshuram and there are footprints in the rock 4 times the size of normal humans. This fort on a lower plateau has a temple of goddess Renuka, Parshuram's mother and also a Yagya Kunda with pits for poles to erect a shamiyana on the banks of a big water tank. 

According to the Sangam classic Purananuru, the Chera king Senkuttuvan conquered the lands between Kanyakumari and the Himalayas. Lacking worthy enemies, he besieged the sea by throwing his spear into it. According to the 17th-century Malayalam work Keralolpathi, the lands of Kerala were recovered from the sea by the axe-wielding warrior sage Parashurama, the sixth Incarnation of Vishnu (hence, Kerala is also called Parashurama Kshetram 'The Land of Parashurama'). Parashurama threw his axe across the sea, and the water receded as far as it reached. According to legend, this new area of land extended from Gokarna to Kanyakumari. The land which rose from sea was filled with salt and unsuitable for habitation; so Parashurama invoked the Snake King Vasuki, who spat holy poison and converted the soil into fertile lush green land. Out of respect, Vasuki and all snakes were appointed as protectors and guardians of the land. P. T. Srinivasa Iyengar has theorised that Senguttuvan may have been inspired by the Parashurama legend, which was brought by early Aryan settlers.

In present-day Goa (or Gomantak), which is a part of the Konkan, there is a temple in Canacona in South Goa district dedicated to Parashurama.

Texts 
Parashurama is generally presented as the fifth son of Renuka and Rishi Jamadagni. The legends of Parashurama appear in many Hindu texts, in different versions:
In Chapter 6 of the Devi Bhagavata Purana, he is born from the thigh with intense light surrounding him that blinds all warriors, who then repent their evil ways and promise to lead a moral life if their eyesight is restored. The boy grants them the boon.
In Chapter 4 of the Vishnu Purana, Rcika prepares a meal for two women, one simple, and another with ingredients that if eaten would cause the woman to conceive a son with martial powers. The latter is accidentally eaten by Renuka, and she then gives birth to Parashurama.
In Chapter 2 of the Vayu Purana, he is born after his mother Renuka eats a sacrificial offering made to both Rudra (Shiva) and Vishnu, which gives him dual characteristics of Kshatriya and Brahmin.

Parashurama is described in some versions of the Mahabharata as the angry Brahmin who with his axe, killed a huge number of Kshatriya warriors because they were abusing their power. In some versions, he even kills his own mother because his father asks him to and because to take his test obeisance towards his parents. After Parashurama obeys his father's order to kill his mother, his father grants him a boon. Parashurama asks for the reward that his mother be brought back to life, and she is restored to life. Parashurama remains filled with sorrow after the violence, repents and expiates his sin. After his Mother comes back to life, he tries to clean the blood-stained axe but he finds a drop of blood which he was unable to clean and tries cleaning the blood drop in different rivers. This is when he moves towards the south of India in search of any holy river where he could clean his axe, finally, he reaches Tirthahalli village in Shimoga, Karnataka and tries to clean the axe and to his surprise, the axe gets cleaned in the holy river of Tunga. With respect towards the holy river, he constructs a Shiva linga and performs pooja and the temple is named as Rameshwara temple. The place where Parashurama cleaned his axe is called Ramakunda.

He plays important roles in the Mahabharata serving as mentor to Bhishma (chapter 5.178), Drona (chapter 1.121) and Karna (chapter 3.286), teaching weapon arts and helping key warriors in both sides of the war.

In the regional literature of Kerala, he is the founder of the land, the one who brought it out of the sea and settled a Hindu community there. He is also known as Rama Jamadagnya and Rama Bhargava in some Hindu texts. Parashurama retired in the Mahendra Mountains, according to chapter 2.3.47 of the Bhagavata Purana. He is the only incarnation of Vishnu who never dies, never returns to abstract Vishnu and lives in meditative retirement. Further, he is the only incarnation of Vishnu that co-exists with other Vishnu incarnations Ram and Krishna in some versions of the Ramayana and Mahabharata, respectively.

Samanta Panchaka 
According to the Sangraha Parva, after killing 21 generations of Kshatriyas, he filled their blood in five pools collectively known as the Samantha Panchaka (Sanskrit: समंत पञ्चक). He later atoned for his sin by severe penance. The five pools are considered to be holy.

The Anukramanika Parva says that the Samantha Panchaka is located somewhere around Kurukshetra. It also mentions that the Pandavas performed a few religious rites near the Samantha Panchaka before the Kurukshetra War.

Parashurama Kshetra
There is much interpretation of 'Parashurama Kshetra' (Land of Parashurama) mentioned in the Puranas.

The region on the western coast of India from Gokarna to Kanyakumari was known as Parashurama Kshetra.

The region of Konkan was also considered as Parashurama Kshetra.

The ancient Saptakonkana is a slightly larger region described in the Sahyadrikhanda which refers to it as Parashuramakshetra (Sanskrit for "The Land Of Parashurama"), Vapi to Tapi is an area of South Gujarat, India. This area is called "Parshuram Ni Bhoomi".

Iconography

The Hindu literature on iconography such as the Vishnudharmottara Purana and Rupamandana describes him as a man with matted locks, with two hands, one carrying an axe. However, the Agni Purana portrays his iconography with four hands, carrying his axe, bow, arrow and sword. The Bhagavata Purana describes his icon as one with four hands, carrying his axe, bow, arrows and a shield like a warrior. Though a warrior, his representation inside Hindu temples with him in war scenes is rare (the Basohli temple is one such exception). Typically, he is shown with two hands, with an axe in his right hand either seated or standing.

Temples

The Anantheshwara Temple is a famous temple in Udupi where Parashurama is worshipped in the form of a lingam. 

There is a temple for Parashurama in Thiruvallam near Thiruvananthapuram Kerala. The temple called Athyarala in Rajempet, Andhra Pradesh, is dedicated to Parashurama. There is a Parshuram Kund, a Hindu pilgrimage centre in Lohit District of Arunachal Pradesh which is dedicated to Parashurama. Thousands of pilgrims visit the place in winter every year, especially on the Makar Sankranti day for a holy dip in the sacred kund which is believed to wash away one's sins. Mahurgad is one of the Shakti Pitha shrines in Maharashtra's Nanded District, where a famous temple of goddess Renuka exists. This temple at Mahurgad is always full of pilgrims. People also come to visit Parashurama temple on the same Mahurgad. The 108 Shiva Temples in Kerala which are believed to be consecrated by Parashurama.

Other places where temples for Parashurama are found are Chiplun in Ratnagiri District, Maharashtra and at Udupi, Karnataka. In Karnataka, there are a group of 7 temples in the stretch of Tulunadu (coastal Karnataka), known as Parashurama Kshetras, namely, Kollur, Koteshwara, Kukke Subrahmanya, Udupi, Gokarna, Anegudde (Kumbhasi) and Shankaranarayana.

Gallery

In popular culture 
On top of the hills  of Janapav is a Shiva temple where Parshurama is believed to have worshipped Shiva, the ashram is known as Jamadagni Ashram, named after his father. The place also has a Kund (Pond) that is being developed by the state government.

In Kannada folklore, especially in devotional songs sung by the Devdasis he is often referred to as a son of Yellamma. Parashurama legends are notable for their discussion of violence, the cycles of retaliations, the impulse of krodha (anger), the inappropriateness of krodha, and repentance.

See also
Bhagwan Parshuram
Bhagavad Gita
Chiranjivi
Heheya Kingdom
Kalachuri Kingdom
Parasuram Express
Vijaya (bow)

Notes

References

Bibliography

External links
Is Parshuram Still Alive?  Lord Parshuram story by hindugodimage
Parshuram Stuti The Stuti of Purshuram by Jai Bhole

 108 Parashurama Kshetras published by Shaivam and Google Maps

Chiranjivins
Rishis
Sages in the Ramayana
Characters in the Mahabharata
Akilattirattu Ammanai
Ayyavazhi mythology
Avatars of Vishnu
Savior gods
Salakapurusa
Hindu gods
Jain mythology